Tetragonoderus quadrinotatus is a species of beetle in the family Carabidae. It was described by Fabricus in 1798.

References

quadrinotatus
Beetles described in 1798